2007 Empress's Cup Final was the 29th final of the Empress's Cup competition. The final was played at National Stadium in Tokyo on January 1, 2008. Nippon TV Beleza won the championship.

Overview
Nippon TV Beleza won their 8th title, by defeating defending champion Tasaki Perule FC – with Homare Sawa and Eriko Arakawa goal.

Match details

See also
2007 Empress's Cup

References

Empress's Cup
2007 in Japanese women's football